The Calabrian lira is a traditional musical instrument characteristic of some areas of Calabria, region in southern Italy.

Characteristics 
The lira of Calabria is a bowed string instrument with three strings. Like most bowed liras, it is played upright, usually supported on the knee, held with the left hand touching the strings with the nails laterally while the right hand moves the bow. The repertory of the lira includes accompaniment songs (e.g. serenades and songs of anger) and songs suitable for dancing (tarantellas). The repertory of this traditional instrument is known only through records of older players, or people who have known them. On the other hand, in recent years an increased interest around this instrument has led to its use by music groups of traditional music and to the appearance of new manufacturers in different parts of Calabria.

Origin 
The Calabrian lira is closely related to the bowed lira (Greek: λύρα) of the Byzantine Empire. The Persian geographer of the 9th century Ibn Khurradadhbih (died 911) was the first to cite the Byzantine lira, as a typical bowed instrument of the Byzantines (Margaret J. Kartomi, 1990). Similar bowed instruments descendants of the Byzantine lira have continued to be played in many post-Byzantine regions until the present day with small changes: the gadulka in Bulgaria, the lyra of Crete and the Dodecanese in Greece, the lyra of Pontos and the classical kemenche (Turkish:Armudî kemençe, Greek:Πολίτικη Λύρα ~ Politiki lira) in Turkey. The Byzantine lira spread westward to Europe, with uncertain evolution; authors in the 11th and 12th centuries use the words fiddle and lira interchangeably (Encyclopædia Britannica. 2009).

Bibliography 
 Margaret J. Kartomi: On Concepts and Classifications of Musical Instruments. Chicago Studies in Ethnomusicology, University of Chicago Press, 1990
La lira calabrese, supplemento a Calabria, Catanzaro, maggio 1987, quaderno n. 2, anno XV, n. 25.
 libricino del cd La lira in Calabria - RLS 002 - Coop. "R.L.S.", Catanzaro, 1994.
La lira, di Goffredo Plastino, Edizioni Monteleone (VV).
 "lira." Encyclopædia Britannica. 2009. Encyclopædia Britannica Online. 28 February  2009

Bowed instruments
Calabrian musical instruments
String instruments
Articles containing video clips